Eram Air was an Iranian charter airline based in Tabriz, Iran.

History
It was founded in December 2005 by Mohammad Ali Shafiei, and started operation by 2006. It offered 7 Destinations with a fleet total of 8 aircraft. The airline ceased operation in 2013 due to unknown resources, but mainly because of low ridership. Shafiei announced in 2014 that he has plans to restart Eram air soon, but never released more info.

Destinations
As of 2012, Eram Air offered the following International and domestic destinations.

Fleet

The Eram Air fleet consisted of the following aircraft as of June 2012:

References

External links

 

2013 disestablishments in Iran
Defunct airlines of Iran
Airlines established in 2005
Airlines disestablished in 2013
Iranian companies established in 2005